The fourth season of the South Korean reality television competition show K-pop Star premiered on SBS on November 23, 2014, airing Sunday evenings at 4:50 pm KST as part of the Good Sunday lineup. Yang Hyun-suk, Park Jin-young, and You Hee-yeol returned as judges. The contest began receiving applications in June, with preliminary auditions taking place in Seoul and throughout South Korea, as well as the United States, Australia, Singapore, and Hong Kong until September 2014. The season ended on April 12, 2015, with Katie Kim crowned as winner and choosing to sign with YG Entertainment.

A special episode containing behind the scenes footage and interviews aired the following week. The show decided to change its rule and give the two runners-up, Jung Seung-hwan and Lee Jin-ah, the chance to choose the company they want to join as well. Both contestants chose Antenna Music and were accepted. On May 14, Lily M revealed that she has signed an exclusive contract with JYP Entertainment.

Process 
Audition applications + Preliminary auditions (June - September 2014)
Preliminary auditions were held from around the world in United States, Australia, Hong Kong, Singapore, and other countries. 
Round 1: Talent Audition (Airdate: November 23 - December 7, 2014)
Contestants who passed the preliminary auditions appear in front of the three judges for the first time. Contestants can pass with at least two "passes" from the judges, or the judge can offer to use the Wild Card. 
Round 2: Ranking Audition (Airdate: December 7–28, 2014)
Contestants who pass the first round are put into groups with others that are most similar to their age or singing style. The whole group can pass, fail, or a selected few can pass. Each contestant gets to have one-on-one training with Park Jin-young, Yang Hyun-suk, or You Hee-yeol.
Round 3: Team Mission (Airdate: January 4–18, 2015)
Contestants form teams to compete head to head.  The winning team moves on to the next round.  A member of the losing team must be eliminated.
Round 4: Casting Audition (Airdate: January 18 - February 1, 2015)
Contestants perform solo or in teams assigned by the judges.  Each judge has six casting cards.  Each spot can be occupied by a contestant or a team of contestants.  Contestants not selected in the casting round are eliminated.
Round 5: Battle Audition (Airdate: February 8–22, 2015)
Contestants represent the company they were cast to in a 1 to 1 to 1 battle. First place automatically gets to be in the Top 10, while 3rd place is eliminated. 2nd place takes another round by themselves. Anyone who does not get in the Top 10 teams/contestants is eliminated.
Round 6: Stage Audition (Airdate: March 1 - April 12, 2015)
 For the Top 8 Finals, the Top 10 competed in two groups on stage with the results determined by the judges. The top three contestants from each group were chosen to proceed to the next round.
 The Top 8, who proceeded to the live stage, were determined by the three judges as well as a 100-member Audience Judging Panel. The last two contestants from each group became Elimination Candidates, with the Audience Judging Panel voting for their preferred act. The two acts with the most votes from the four Elimination Candidates proceeded to the Top 8, with the other two contestants eliminated.
For the Top 6, Top 4, Top 3 Finals, Semifinals and Finals, the judges and viewers' scores were weighted 60:40, and were combined to eliminate the contestant with the lowest score.

Judges 
Yang Hyun-suk: YG Entertainment CEO, producer, singer
Park Jin-young: JYP Entertainment Executive producer, producer, singer, songwriter
You Hee-yeol: Antenna Music CEO, founder, singer, songwriter, composer, pianist

Top 10 
Katie Kim: Born 1993, from New Jersey, United States, Winner, signed and left YG Entertainment, under company AXIS 
Jung Seung-hwan: Born 1996, from Incheon, Runner-up, debuted under Antenna Music
Lee Jin-ah: Born 1991, from Seoul, eliminated on April 5, 2015 (5th Live), debuted under Antenna Music
Lily M.: Born 2002, from Australia, eliminated on March 29, 2015 (4th Live), signed under JYP Entertainment, and debuted as a member of girl group Nmixx in 2022
Park Yoon-ha: Born 1999, eliminated on March 22, 2015 (3rd Live), signed under Jellyfish Entertainment
Esther Kim: Born 1999, from Los Angeles, California, United States, eliminated on March 22, 2015 (3rd Live)
Grace Shin: Born 1988, from New York, United States, eliminated on March 15, 2015 (2nd Live)
Sparkling Girls, eliminated on March 15, 2015 (2nd Live)
Erin Miranda: Born 1999, from Australia
Hwang Yoon-joo: Born 1995, from Incheon
Choi Jin-sil: Born 1994, from Busan
Choi Joo-won: Born 1998, from Seoul
Ji John, eliminated on March 8, 2015 (1st Live)
Jang Mi-ji: Born 1995, from Seoul
John Chu: Born 1995, from Los Angeles, United States
Seo Ye-ahn: Born 1997, from Yeongju, eliminated on March 8, 2015 (1st Live), debuted under JTM Entertainment

Round 6: Stage Auditions 
 For the Top 8 Finals, the Top 10 competed in two groups on stage with the results determined by the judges. The top three contestants from each group were chosen to proceed to the next round.
 The Top 8, who proceeded to the live stage, were determined by the three judges as well as a 100-member Audience Judging Panel. The last two contestants from each group became Elimination Candidates, with the Audience Judging Panel voting for their preferred act. The two acts with the most votes from the four Elimination Candidates proceeded to the Top 8, with the other two contestants eliminated.

 The Top 8 competes 1:1 on the live stage with the results determined by the judges. One contestant from each group is chosen to proceed to the next round.
 The contestants not chosen will go through live SMS voting by viewers, where the top contestants will proceed to the next round.
 Of the remaining contestants, the judges choose one contestant to proceed to the Top 6.

For the next three episodes (18-20), each week showcased a different company. As this season featured the winner choosing the company they wished to sign with on the final live stage, this gave the contestants the opportunity to experience and explore each company equally. The first week (Top 4 Finals) was YG Week, in which contestants received advice and help from YG. The second week (Top 3 Finals) was JYP Week. The third week (Semifinals) was Antenna Week.
For the Top 4, 3 Finals, Semifinals and Finals, the judges and viewers' scores were weighted 60:40, and were combined to eliminate the contestant with the lowest score.

Ratings 
In the ratings below, the highest rating for the show will in be red, and the lowest rating for the show will be in blue. (Note: Individual corner ratings do not include commercial time, which regular ratings include.)

References

External links 
  K-pop Star 4 Official Homepage
  

 
2014 South Korean television series debuts